In 7-dimensional geometry, a 7-simplex is a self-dual regular 7-polytope. It has 8 vertices, 28 edges, 56 triangle faces, 70 tetrahedral cells, 56 5-cell 5-faces, 28 5-simplex 6-faces, and 8 6-simplex 7-faces. Its dihedral angle is cos−1(1/7), or approximately 81.79°.

Alternate names 
It can also be called an octaexon, or octa-7-tope, as an 8-facetted polytope in 7-dimensions. The name octaexon is derived from octa for eight facets in Greek and -ex for having six-dimensional facets, and -on. Jonathan Bowers gives an octaexon the acronym oca.

As a configuration
This configuration matrix represents the 7-simplex. The rows and columns correspond to vertices, edges, faces, cells, 4-faces, 5-faces and 6-faces. The diagonal numbers say how many of each element occur in the whole 7-simplex. The nondiagonal numbers say how many of the column's element occur in or at the row's element. This self-dual simplex's matrix is identical to its 180 degree rotation.

Coordinates 

The Cartesian coordinates of the vertices of an origin-centered regular octaexon having edge length 2 are:

More simply, the vertices of the 7-simplex can be positioned in 8-space as permutations of (0,0,0,0,0,0,0,1). This construction is based on facets of the 8-orthoplex.

Images

Orthographic projections

Related polytopes 
This polytope is a facet in the uniform tessellation 331 with Coxeter-Dynkin diagram:

This polytope is one of 71 uniform 7-polytopes with A7 symmetry.

Notes

External links 
 
 Polytopes of Various Dimensions
 Multi-dimensional Glossary

7-polytopes